Antonio Mihai Stan (born 3 October 2000) is a Romanian professional footballer who plays as a midfielder for Liga I side FC Voluntari. He also played for clubs such as Vedița Colonești, Unirea Bascov, FC U Craiova 1948 or Politehnica Iași.

Personal life
Antonio is the nephew of Nicolae Stan (Mayor of Colonești) and the son of Mircea Stan, a former top-flight player.

References

External links
 

2000 births
Living people
Sportspeople from Pitești
Romanian footballers
Association football midfielders
Liga I players
Liga II players
Liga III players
FC U Craiova 1948 players
FC Argeș Pitești players
FC Politehnica Iași (2010) players
FC Voluntari players